Ghar Jamai is an Indian comedy television series which premiered on Zee TV in 1997. The series was produced by Meteor Films and starred Satish Shah, R. Madhavan, and Mandira Bedi.

Cast

Main
R. Madhavan as Malayatoor Subramaniam Namboodiripad (Subbu)
Satish Shah as Vishamber Mehra
Mandira Bedi as Chandni
Sadhana Singh as Paghwan/Prakash Kaur/Parkash beebi
Asrani as Doctor Masani
Gracy Singh / Vipra Rawal as Chandni's sister
Anand Goradia as Chandni's brother
Sunil Jetly as cook

Guest
Viju Khote as Muthuswamy 
Varsha Usgaonkar as Miss Chamcham 
Gajendra Chauhan as Sidhu Singh 
K.D.Chandran as  Subramanium/Subbu Father 
Ashwini Kalsekar as Rohiniamma 
Atul Parchure as Police Constable Ghorpade 
Hemant Pandey as Police Inspector Faterfaker 
Surbhi Tiwari as College Student 
Satyen Kappu as Chandni Grandfather 
Suchitra Pillai as Subbulakshmi 
Shrivallabh Vyas as Kidnapper Subhash Singh(Subbu)/ Gajraj Singh (Guest role in two episodes) 
Murali Sharma as Doctor Salim 
Javed Khan Amrohi as Hotel Receptionist 
Daya Shankar Pandey as Hotel Union Leader/ Robert (Guest role in two Episodes)
Shehzad Khan  as Bus Driver/ KK Don (Guest role in two episodes)
Ajay Nagrath as Subbu and Chandni Son 
Kavi Kumar Azad as Judge in Food Competition 
Kuljeet Randhawa as Subramanium/Subbu friend 
Rajesh Puri as Pradeep Bhagwadewala 
Dinyar Contractor as Dr. Masani

Feature film
In September 2011, Ananth Mahadevan announced plans of making a feature film inspired by the series with Madhavan in the lead role, and also titled the project as Ghar Jamai. Despite plans to shoot the film in Toronto during 2012, the idea did not develop into production.

References

Zee TV original programming
Indian comedy television series
Indian television sitcoms
1997 Indian television series debuts
1998 Indian television series endings